The Legal Aid Society is a 501(c)(3) non-profit legal aid provider based in New York City. Founded in 1876, it is the oldest and largest provider of legal aid in the United States. Its attorneys provide representation on criminal and civil matters in both individual cases and class action lawsuits. The organization is funded through a combination of public grants and private donations. It is the largest recipient of funding among regional legal aid providers from the New York City government and is the city's primary legal services provider.

History and leadership 
The Legal Aid Society was founded in 1876 in New York to defend the individual rights of German immigrants who could not afford to hire a lawyer. A large donation from the Rockefeller Family in 1890 enabled the organization to expand its services and include individuals from every background. It was renamed the New York Legal Aid Society in 1890. The society is governed by a board of directors. On December 2, 2010, Richard J. Davis was elected chairman of the board.

Presidents 
Alan Levine, president 2019 to present
Blaine V. (Fin) Fogg, president from 2009 to 2019.
Charles Evans Hughes, third president beginning 1916.
Arthur von Briesen, second president from 1890 to 1916.

Attorneys-in-Chief 
 Twyla Carter, beginning August 1, 2022. Carter is the first Black woman and first Asian-American to lead the organization.
Janet Sabel, January 2, 2019, to June 1, 2022.
Seymour W. James, Jr., July 1, 2014, to June 30, 2018.
Steven Banks, 2004 to March 31, 2014.
Daniel L. Greenberg, 1994 to 2004.
Archibald R. Murray, 1975 to 1994.
Cornelius Porter Kitchel, 1905 to 1906. He was the sixth attorney-in-chief.
Charles K. Lexow, beginning 1876. He was the first attorney-in-chief.

Services
The Legal Aid Society provides a range of civil legal services, as well as criminal defense work, and juvenile representation in Family Court. The organization's primary purpose is to provide free legal assistance to New Yorkers who live at or below the poverty level and cannot afford to hire a lawyer when confronted with a legal problem. It handles more than 200,000 indigent criminal cases every year, serves as attorneys to more than 30,000 children and represents families, individuals and community groups in more than 30,000 cases. Legal Aid also conducts major class action litigation on behalf of thousands of welfare recipients, foster children, homeless families, elderly poor, inmates at Rikers Island and other prisoners.

The Legal Aid Society is the city's primary provider of criminal legal aid contract attorneys, along with New York County Defender Services in Manhattan, Brooklyn Defender Services in Brooklyn, Bronx Defenders in the Bronx, Queens Law Associates in Queens, and the Neighborhood Defender Service in northern Manhattan. For New York City in fiscal year 2014, Legal Aid handled 225,776 cases for $102.5 million in compensation from the city (an average of $454 per case).

See also
 Judiciary of New York
 Law of New York
 Legal Aid Society of Cleveland
 Legal Aid Society of the District of Columbia

References

Further reading

External links

 
Legal advocacy organizations in the United States
Organizations established in 1876
Non-profit organizations based in New York City
Criminal defense organizations
New York (state) state courts
1876 establishments in New York (state)
Public defense institutions
Legal aid in the United States